Antonio Bernardo is an Italian-American neurosurgeon and academic physician. He is a professor of Neurological Surgery and the Director of the Neurosurgical Innovations and Training Center for Skull Base and Microneurosurgery in the Department of Neurological Surgery at Weill Cornell Medical College. He has gained significant notoriety for his expertise in skull base and cerebrovascular surgery, and has published extensively on minimally invasive neurosurgery. He is a pioneer in the use of 3D technology in neurosurgery and a strong advocate for competency-based training in surgery.

Early life 
Bernardo was born and raised in Naples, Italy.

Education 
Bernardo earned his medical degree from the University of Naples Federico II in 1990 and completed residency training in neurosurgery at The Western General Hospital in Edinburgh, Scotland, which is part of NHS Lothian. During his residency, he worked extensively on the epidemiology and treatment of head injury and hemorrhagic stroke with Douglas Miller.

Following residency he trained in skull base and cerebrovascular surgery at the University of California, Irvine from 1997 to 1999 and subsequently completed fellowship training in Skull Base Surgery at the Barrow Neurological Institute, under the mentorship of Robert Spetzler.

Professional career 
Following his time at the University of California, Irvine, Bernardo moved to Peru in 1999 and joined the Foundation for International Education in Neurological Surgery (FIENS) as part of an effort to establish skull base surgery programs in hospitals throughout the country.

In 2000, Bernardo joined the neurosurgery faculty of the University of Medicine and Dentistry of New Jersey, where he was also the co-director of their Microneurosurgery Skull Base Laboratory.

Following completion of his fellowship at the Barrow Neurological Institute, he joined the Faculty of Weill Cornell Medical College in 2004 where he is currently a professor of Neurosurgery and the Director of the Surgical Innovations Lab for Skull Base and Microneurosurgery.

Bernardo co-founded the Weill Cornell Surgical Innovations Laboratory, a research and training facility for neurosurgeons, wherein he directs a fellowship training program in skull base and microneurosurgery. The laboratory works on the development of new operative techniques in neurosurgery as well as the integration of neurosurgery with novel technologies. Bernardo's current areas of research include minimally invasive and transtubular neurosurgery, surgical simulation and planning, surgical robotics, flexible endoscopy, flexible surgical instrumentation, white matter navigation, 3D printing, virtual and augmented reality, and the development of novel operative techniques in microneurosurgery.

Bernardo currently practices neurosurgery in several countries where he exclusively operates complex skull base and cerebrovascular surgical cases.

Humanitarian work 
Bernardo has been a vocal proponent for the advancement of neurosurgical education in developing countries and has provided educational opportunities for surgeons from around the world through courses and his fellowship program. Since 1999, he has regularly volunteered his time for surgery and to teach surgeons in a number of developing countries in Latin America.

Awards 
1994, Bruel & Kijel Travelling Fellowship Award from the Department of Neurosurgery at the Righospitalet in Copenhagen, Denmark
1999, Excellence in Clinical Teaching Award from the 
2000, Excellence in Clinical Teaching Award from the 
2001, Lou Grubb Fellowship in Skull Base Anatomy, Barrow Neurological Institute
2002, Annual Clinical Excellence Award from Medtronic 
2002, Best Scientific Paper, Annual Meeting of the Caribbean Association of Neurological Surgeons
2003, Honored Guest at the Annual Meeting of the Colombian Association of Otolaryngology, Head and Neck Surgery, and Maxillo-Facial Surgery
2004, Award for Excellence in Surgery and Teaching from the University of Guadalajara, Mexico
2004, Honored guest at the Annual Meeting of the Colombian Association of Neurological Surgeons
2006, Gold Medal from the Venezuelan Congress of Neurological Surgeons for his contribution to the development of Neurosurgery in Venezuela
2008, Gold medal from the Latin American Federation of Neurological Surgeons for his contribution to the development of Neurosurgery in Latin America
2015, Friendship Award from the Gruppo Esponenti Italiani
2015, Honorary Member of the Italian Association of Neurological Surgeons
2015, Honored Guest at the Annual Meeting of the Italian Association of Neurological Surgeons
2016, Grand Award of Merit, American Society of the Italian Legions of Merit 
2017, Cavaliere of the Order of Merit of the Italian Republic

Selected publications

Books and book chapters 
Bernardo A, Stieg PE, Orbitocranial Zygomatic Approach for Upper Basilar Artery Aneurysms, Chapter 11 in: Mcdonald RL, Neurosurgical Operative Atlas: Vascular Neurosurgery, 2nd ed., New York, NY: Thieme Verlagsgruppe, 2009.  
Bernardo A, Stieg PE, Translabyrinthine and Transcochlear Petrosal Approaches, Chapter 12 in: Cappabianca P, Califano L, Iaconetta G, (eds.) Cranial, Craniofacial and Skull Base Surgery, Milan, Italy: Springer-Verlag Mailand; 2010. 
Bernardo A, Evins AI, Neurosurgical Anatomy and Approaches to Simulation in Neurosurgical Training, in: Alaraj A, ed. Comprehensive Healthcare Simulation: Neurosurgery Edition, New York, NY: Springer; 2018. 
Bernardo A, Evins AI, Transtubular Neurosurgery: Minimally Invasive Transtubular Techniques, Operative Approaches, and Surgical Anatomy, New York, NY: Thieme. Forthcoming.

Research articles 
.
.
.
.
.
.
.
.
.

References 

Living people
American neurosurgeons
Cornell University faculty
American neuroscientists
Year of birth missing (living people)
University of Naples Federico II alumni